Twisted Tales is a British comedy-horror anthology television series written by a mix of established writers and upcoming talent that aired on BBC Three from January to April 2005. It consisted of fourteen self-contained episodes with a mysterious twist and had the same format as a previous BBC Three series of six comedy-horror stories, Spine Chillers (2003).

The cast included up-and-coming comedians, such as Catherine Tate, Nick Frost, Marcus Brigstocke, Steve Edge and more, among distinguished actors like Alison Steadman, Paul Darrow, Mary Tamm, Phil Cornwell, Doon Mackichan and Annette Badland. The comedy duo Mitchell and Webb, best known for the Channel 4 sitcom Peep Show, both wrote and starred in the ninth episode "Nothing to Fear".

Production 
Directors Andy Goddard and Crispin Whittell shot four episodes of the series each, while Susan Tully and Jonathan Gershfield directed three episodes each.

Simon Lacey has composed the music for all four episodes directed by Whittell: "Charlie's Angel", "The Irredeemable Brain of Dr Heinrich Hunsecker", "Whacked" and "The Patter of Tiny Feet".

Episodes

Reception 
While reviewing the first episode of the series for The Times, Angus Batey said, "The excellent cast seems unsure whether it's supplying chuckles or chills, but the format – essentially Tales of the Unexpected for the 21st century – has potential". Another critic from the newspaper, David Chater, noticed the same flaw in the tenth episode, stating that the tale "can't seem to make up its mind whether to play for laughs or shocks" and has a "queasy tone". He did, however, praise Doon Mackichan's performance in the episode, saying that she "shines" as Ed's hysterical wife Sandra. The sixth episode, titled "Vacant Possession", was described in The Times as "marvellously dark", while the final one as "risible".

References

External links 
 
 

BBC anthology television shows
2000s British anthology television series
2000s British horror television series
British horror comedy television series
2005 British television series debuts
2005 British television series endings
English-language television shows